(Released in Europe and Australia as Dynablaster) is a maze video game developed and published by Hudson Soft for the Nintendo Entertainment System originally on Japan and Europe in 1991 and later on the US in 1993.

Story
Bomberman is framed for terrible crimes by Black Bomber. After being accused of robbing a bank, Bomberman is thrown in jail. Bomberman's mission is to escape his prison cell and bring the Black Bomber to justice.

Gameplay
The game follows the classic Bomberman formula and it's based directly on the 1990 Bomberman video game. Players control Bomberman, who is in a room full of blocks and enemies and must plant bombs to destroy the blocks and enemies. Several blocks contain power-ups (such as blast radius increasers or fuse shorteners), and one in each level contains a door, which takes Bomberman to the next level.

Passwords are given after a game over, recording the level, number of bombs, and strength of bombs.  These passwords can be entered when the game starts, allowing players to continue where they left off.

New to the series are the multi-player modes. Vs Mode is a two-player mode, while Battle Mode is a three-player mode. The objective is to kill the opposing Bomberman by planting bombs. An NES Four Score is required to play the three-player mode.

Notes

References

External links
Hudson Soft page

1991 video games
2
Nintendo Entertainment System games
Nintendo Entertainment System-only games
Top-down video games
Multiplayer and single-player video games
Video game sequels
Video games developed in Japan
Video games scored by Jun Chikuma
Puzzle video games
Maze games
Hudson Soft games